The Animal Health and Welfare Act 1984 was a piece of UK legislation that amended the provisions of the Animal Health Act 1981 related to
 the seizure of things for the purpose of preventing the spread of disease,
 powers of entry upon private premises,
 declarations as to places infected with a disease,
 to enable certain orders under that Act to operate in or over territorial waters,
 to amend the Slaughter of Poultry Act 1967,
 to enable provision to be made for controlling the practice of artificial breeding of livestock,
 to repeal the Improvement of Live Stock (Licensing of Bulls) Act 1931 and the Horse Breeding Act 1958,
 to amend the Medicines Act 1968 in relation to feeding stuffs and veterinary drugs, the registers of which are kept by the Pharmaceutical Society of Great Britain

The Criminal Justice Act 2003 increased the penalties related to the artificial breeding of livestock to 51 weeks from the 3 months stated in this 1984 Act.

See also
 Agriculture Act 1970

References

History of agriculture in the United Kingdom
Poultry diseases
Animal viral diseases
Bird diseases
United Kingdom Acts of Parliament 1984
Disease outbreaks in the United Kingdom
Animal virology
Avian influenza
Agricultural health and safety